The Raid of Marrakech took place in 1515, when the Portuguese governor of Safi Nuno Fernandes de Ataíde led a raid that penetrated as far as Marrakech in hopes of forcing its Hintata ruler to accept Portuguese suzerainty, the attack, however, failed.

It is considered the most daring exploit in the career of Ataíde.

Battle 
The Portuguese seized Azemmour (Azamor) in 1513 and erected a new fortress nearby at Mazagan (Magazão, now al-Jadida) in 1514. From Safi and Azemmour, the Portuguese cultivated the alliance of local Arab and Berber client tribes in the surrounding region, notably a certain powerful Yahya ibn Tafuft. The Portuguese and their allies dispatched armed columns inland, subjugating the region of Doukkala and soon encroaching on Marrakesh. By 1514, the Portuguese and their clients under the command of almocadém of Safi David Lopes had reached the outskirts of Marrakesh, some Berber auxiliaries managing to reach the walls of the city, thrust their spears into the gates and shout:

Nasir ibn Chentaf, the Hintata ruler of the city, was forced to agree to tribute and allow the Portuguese to erect a fortress in Marrakesh. However, the agreement was not carried out, so the next year the Portuguese and their Moorish allies returned at the head of a strong army, aiming to seize Marrakesh directly.

Ataíde raised an army of about 3000 men mostly made up of Berber auxiliaries, It included 200 lancers under the command of Portuguese governor of Azamor Dom Pedro de Sousa, 300 lancer under Ataíde, 600 lancers commanded by the sheikh of Abida, 800 by the sheikh Cid Meimam of Xerquia and 1000 by the sheikh of Garabia. 

His men left from Azamor and Safim on April 22. They and reached the banks of the Tensift River two days later. On April 24, 1515, they engaging in fighting with the defenders of Marrakech, near the gates of Bab el-Khemis and Bab ad-Debbagh, located on the northeast side of the Walls, the Hintata ruler of Marrakesh was supported by Wattasids and Saadians 

Ataíde commanded the center, the sheikhs of Abida and Xerquia the left Portuguese wing, the sheikh of Garabia on the right. The fighting resulted in dead and wounded on both sides and lasted four hours, after which the Portuguese withdrew to avoid being surrounded. The withdrawal lasted another two days, however, it was not a peaceful because their rear was pursued by the Moroccans.

See also 

Battle of Azemmour
Battle of Tednest
Battle of Mamora (1515)
Portuguese Tangier
Portuguese Asilah

References 

Cenival, Pierre de (1913-36) "Marrakush" in T. Houtsma, editor, The Encyclopedia of Islam: a dictionary of the geography, ethnogropy and biography of the Mohammaden peoples. Reprinted 1987 as E.J. Brill's Encyclopedia of Islam, Leiden: E.J. Brill., vol.5 p.296-306

Cenival Pierre de (2007) "Marrakesh", new edition of 1913-36 article, in C.E. Bosworth, editor,Historic Cities of the Islamic World, Leiden: Brill p.319-32.

Battles involving Morocco
Battles involving Portugal
16th century in Morocco
Morocco–Portugal military relations